Robbin Remers (born 20 August 1991) is a Dutch water polo player.

She was part of the Dutch team at the 2011 World Aquatics Championships,

See also
Netherlands at the 2011 World Aquatics Championships

References

External links

1994 births
Dutch female water polo players
Living people